Rafael Ferreira Francisco (born April 13, 1986) usually known by the nickname Toró, is a Brazilian professional footballer who plays as a defensive midfielder for Finnish club GBK Kokkola.

References

External links

Guardian Stats Centre 
globoesporte

1986 births
Living people
Brazilian footballers
Brazilian expatriate footballers
Fluminense FC players
CR Flamengo footballers
Clube Atlético Mineiro players
Figueirense FC players
Esporte Clube Bahia players
SC Sagamihara players
Anápolis Futebol Clube players
Goiás Esporte Clube players
HIFK Fotboll players
FF Jaro players
Campeonato Brasileiro Série A players
Campeonato Brasileiro Série B players
J3 League players
Veikkausliiga players
Brazilian expatriate sportspeople in Japan
Brazilian expatriate sportspeople in Finland
Expatriate footballers in Japan
Expatriate footballers in Finland
Association football midfielders
Footballers from Rio de Janeiro (city)